The Kiribati national football team is the national men's football team of Kiribati and is controlled by the Kiribati Islands Football Association. Kiribati is not a member of FIFA but is an associate member of the Oceania Football Confederation (OFC), and is therefore not eligible to enter the FIFA World Cup but may enter the OFC Nations Cup. It became a provisional member of the N.F.-Board on 10 December 2005.

Kiribati is also a member of the ConIFA.

Background
Kiribati have only ever played 11 International matches up to April 2012 where they scored 7 goals and conceded 125. All of these matches were played away from home due to the lack of grass pitches in the archipelago. The Bairiki National Stadium has a sand pitch rather than grass. Kiribati's first match took place in Fiji on 30 August 1979 when they played Fiji, losing 24–0 in a South Pacific Games match. The side have never won a match but came very close when they lost 3–2 to fellow minnows Tuvalu on 30 June 2003 in Pool A of the South Pacific Games in Fiji, as well as losing 4–2 in penalties to Tuvalu in the consolation round of the 1979 South Pacific Games. Kiribati's only two goals in the 2011 Pacific games were scored by Karotu Bakaane versus Papua New Guinea and Erene Bakineti versus Tahiti, but in the 2003 competition, both goals against Tuvalu came from Lawrence Nemeia on the 26th minute and the 46th minute.

In 2012, Scotsman Kevin McGreskin became the team's coach, with the aim of improving its results and obtaining recognition from FIFA.

On 10 April 2015, Jake Kewley was officially appointed as the Manager and Ambassador for the Kiribati Islands National Football Team with the remit of liaising with the relevant footballing bodies to advance Kiribati's prior membership applications, with a FIFA application being drafted, finalised and submitted later that year.

On 6 May 2016, Kiribati was formally accepted as the newest member of ConIFA (Confederation of Independent Football Associations), becoming the first ever Oceanic member to join the federation. Kiribati hosted an official visit from ConIFA in November 2016 for the national football competition in Tarawa – Taiwan Sport Tournament – with ConIFA documenting the tournament whilst in the country. Kiribati qualified for the 2018 ConIFA World Football Cup, that was held in England. However, Kiribati were forced to withdraw, with Tuvalu taking their place.

Coaching history

 Pine Iosefa (2003–2011)
  Kevin McGreskin (2012)
 Jake Kewley (2015)

Last squad

Squad selected for the 2011 Pacific Games:

|-

! colspan="9"  style="background:#b0d3fb; text-align:left;"|
|- style="background:#dfedfd;"

|-

! colspan="9"  style="background:#b0d3fb; text-align:left;"|
|- style="background:#dfedfd;"

|-

! colspan="9"  style="background:#b0d3fb; text-align:left;"|
|- style="background:#dfedfd;"

Player records

Note: Missing goalscorers from 1979.

Competitive record

Pacific Games record

Head-to-head record
Up to matches played on 5 September 2011.

Results
Kiribati's score is shown first in each case.

See also

 Kiribati national futsal team

References

 
Football in Kiribati
Oceanian national association football teams
National association football team results
Oceanian national and official selection-teams not affiliated to FIFA
CONIFA member associations